The Agricultural Trade Act of 1978 (P.L. 95-501) directed the establishment of trade offices in major centers of commerce throughout the world. The agricultural trade offices are operated by the Foreign Agricultural Service (FAS) to develop, maintain, and expand international markets for U.S. agricultural commodities and serve as centers for export sales promotion and contact points for importers seeking to buy U.S. farm products.

References 

United States federal agriculture legislation
Agricultural marketing in the United States